The United Kingdom does not recognize Palestine as a state. The UK has a non-accredited Consulate General in Jerusalem that "represents the UK government in Jerusalem, West Bank, and Gaza", and works on "political, commercial, security and economic interests between the UK and the Palestinian territories". Husam Zomlot became head of the Palestine Mission to the United Kingdom in 2018. The State of Palestine was represented in London by Manuel Hassassian, the Palestinian General Delegate to the United Kingdom between 2005 and 2018. Another former Palestinian General Delegate to the UK was Afif Safieh, who began in that role in 1990.

History

Since the Six-Day War, the British government has been active to achieve a diplomatic settlement of the Israeli–Palestinian conflict. The issue of a Palestinian state was raised already in July 1967 by Labour MP Paul Rose. Margaret Thatcher generally supported a Jordanian-Palestinian confederation and was willing to consider some Palestine Liberation Organization involvement in this solution.

On 6 December 2016 a group of Palestinian and British academics, activists and politicians lead by the prominent Palestinian-British Academician Dr Makram Khoury-Machool launched the Palestine 100 Initiative, www.palestine100.net. "Palestine 100 Initiative (P100I) core mission is to keep the candle of hope and the Palestinian flame of activism alive and proliferating. While seeking freedom and independence, it is intended to preserve the broader Palestinian cultural heritage both oral and physical, and to promote it to the wider public, including future generations. Moreover, it aims to act as an umbrella for a vast network of groups that wish to connect and collaborate in different spaces, regions and different languages." During the launching event, which took place in London on 16 December 2016, Baroness Jenny Tonge apologised retrospectively for the release of the Balfour Declaration by the British Government on 2 November 1917, on behalf of her self, friends and family to the Palestinian people.www.palestine100.net. On 2 November 2021 (four days after the 104th anniversary of the Declaration), the Palestine100 held a panel where it was decided to officially approach the British government and ask for apology, compensation and rectifying/withdrawing the Declaration. It was also decided to exhaust all legal avenues in this regard.

In February 2021, the British Consul-General in Jerusalem, Philip Hall, condemned settlements in the Israeli-occupied territories as "illegal and an obstacle to restarting peace talks" between Israel and Palestine. That same month, the Court of First Instance in Nablus ruled that the British government's Balfour Declaration in 1917 was invalid and called on the British government to issue an apology to the Palestinian people. In April, the Palestinian government said that relations had reached a "low point" after British Prime Minister Boris Johnson announced his opposition to an International Criminal Court investigation into alleged war crimes in the Israeli-occupied territories. In May, Pro-Palestinian protests were held in London during that month's Israel–Palestine crisis.

Possible recognition of Palestine

In September 2011, Britain said it would recognise Palestine as a state, but only with non-member observer status, rather than full membership, at the United Nations. In October 2014, the UK House of Commons passed a motion which called on the government to recognise Palestine as an independent state. Also in October 2014, the devolved government of Scotland called for recognition of Palestine as an independent state and for the UK to open an embassy there. Jeremy Corbyn, former Leader of the Opposition, is a longtime advocate for Palestinian causes and repeatedly pledged to recognise the country if elected.

See also
Foreign relations of Palestine
Foreign relations of the United Kingdom

References

External links
Palestine Solidarity Campaign
Britain Palestine Friendship and Twinning Network

 
United Kingdom
Bilateral relations of the United Kingdom
Relations of colonizer and former colony